Daniele Grandi (born 5 February 1993) is an Italian professional footballer who plays as forward for Verbano.

Club career
On 16 July 2021, he joined Serie C club Pro Sesto.

References

External links

1993 births
Living people
People from Clusone
Footballers from Lombardy
Italian footballers
Association football forwards
Serie C players
Serie D players
Atalanta B.C. players
Como 1907 players
S.S. Milazzo players
Bologna F.C. 1909 players
A.C. Bellaria Igea Marina players
A.C. Monza players
A.C. Legnano players
Milano City F.C. players
U.S. 1913 Seregno Calcio players
U.S.D. Caravaggio players
Pro Sesto 2013 players
National Premier Leagues players
Adelaide Blue Eagles players
Italian expatriate footballers
Italian expatriate sportspeople in Australia
Expatriate soccer players in Australia